Thalotia is a genus of sea snails, marine gastropod mollusks in the family Trochidae, the top snails.

Description
The thick, solid shell is imperforate, elevated-conical, granulated or spirally ribbed. The periphery is rounded or obtusely angular. The small aperture is ovate. The outer lip is thick and crenulated within. The columella is toothed at the base and subtruncated.

Species
Species within the genus Thalotia include:
 Thalotia beluchistana Melvill, J.C., 1897
 Thalotia conica (Gray, 1827)
 Thalotia khlimax Vilvens, 2012
 Thalotia polysarchosa Vilvens, 2012
 Thalotia tiaraeides Vilvens, 2012

The following species were brought into synonymy:
 Thalotia aspera Kuroda & Habe, 1952: synonym of Tosatrochus attenuatus (Jonas, 1844)
 Thalotia attenuata (Jonas, 1845): synonym of Tosatrochus attenuatus (Jonas, 1844)
 Thalotia chlorostoma (Menke, 1843): synonym of Odontotrochus chlorostomus (Menke, 1843)
 Thalotia comtessei Iredale, 1931: synonym of Calthalotia fragum (Philippi, 1848)
 Thalotia crenellifera Adams, 1853: synonym of Cantharidus crenelliferus (A. Adams, 1853) 
 Thalotia dubia Tenison-Woods, J.E., 1878: synonym of Thalotia conica (Gray, 1827)
 Thalotia elongata Sowerby, G.B. I, 1818: synonym of Tosatrochus attenuatus (Jonas, 1844)
 Thalotia kotschyi (Philippi, 1849): synonym of Osilinus kotschyi (Philippi, 1849); synonym of Priotrochus kotschyi (Philippi, 1849)
 Thalotia maculata Brazier, 1877: synonym of Turcica maculata (Brazier, 1877) (original combination)
 Thalotia maldivensis Smith, 1903: synonym of Jujubinus maldivensis (E. A. Smith, 1903) (original combination)
 Thalotia mariae Tenison-Woods, 1877: synonym of Cantharidus pulcherrimus W. Wood, 1828
 Thalotia mundula A. Adams & Angas, 1864: synonym of Prothalotia strigata (Adams, 1853)
 Thalotia neglecta Tate, 1893: synonym of Odontotrochus chlorostomus (Menke, K.T., 1843)
 Thalotia ocellata (A. Adams, 1861): synonym of Alcyna ocellata A. Adams, 1860
 Thalotia rariguttata (Sowerby, G.B. III, 1916): synonym of Cantharidus rariguttatus G. B. Sowerby III, 1916
 Thalotia picta Angas, 1865: synonym of Prothalotia lesueuri (P. Fischer, 1880)
 Thalotia pictus Wood, 1828: synonym of Thalotia conica (Gray, 1827)
 Thalotia strigata Adams, 1853: synonym of Prothalotia strigata (Adams, 1853)
 Thalotia subangulata (Pease, 1861): synonym of Alcyna subangulata Pease, 1861
 Thalotia suturalis A. Adams, 1853: synonym of Prothalotia suturalis (A. Adams, 1853) 
 Thalotia torresi E.A. Smith, 1884: synonym of Calthalotia arruensis (Watson, 1880)
 Thalotia woodsiana Angas, 1872: synonym of Thalotia conica (Gray, 1827)
 Thalotia yokohamaensis Donald, K.M., 1878: synonym of Kanekotrochus infuscatus Gould, A.A., 1861
 Thalotia zebrides A. Adams, 1851: synonym of Prothalotia pyrgos Philippi, 1849

References

 Gray, 1847 Proceedings of the Zoological Society of London, 15: 145; Not available (nomen nudum) from Gray, 1840, Synopsis of the contents of the British Museum, ed. 42, first printing: 147; 1842, ed. 44: 57
 Harris, G.F. (1897). Catalogue of Tertiary Mollusca in the Department of Geology, British Museum (Natural History). Part I. The Australasian Tertiary Mollusca. London : British Museum of Natural History. 407 pp. 8 pls.
 Cotton, B.C. (1959). South Australian Mollusca. Archaeogastropoda . Adelaide : South Australian Government Printer.

External links
 To GenBank 
 To ITIS
 To World Register of Marine Species

 
Trochidae
Gastropod genera